Aglyptodactylus is a genus of frogs in the family Mantellidae. These frogs, sometimes known as the Madagascar jumping frogs, are endemic to Madagascar. Systematic revisions of the groups were published in 1998 and 2015. Six species are currently recognized.

Description

Tadpoles
However, they differ in their habitat, ranging from ephemeral pools (Aglyptodactylus laticeps) to river bed pools (Aglyptodactylus securifer) to stagnant pools (Aglyptodactylus madagascariensis). The tadpoles are detritivorous.

Species
There are six Aglyptodactylus species:
 Aglyptodactylus australis Köhler, Glaw, Pabijan & Vences, 2015
 Aglyptodactylus chorus Köhler, Glaw, Pabijan & Vences, 2015
 Aglyptodactylus inguinalis (Günther, 1877)
 Aglyptodactylus laticeps Glaw, Vences & Böhme, 1998
 Aglyptodactylus madagascariensis (Duméril, 1853)
 Aglyptodactylus securifer Glaw, Vences & Böhme, 1998

References

 
Endemic frogs of Madagascar
Amphibian genera
Taxa named by George Albert Boulenger